List of Tuskegee Airmen contains the names of the Tuskegee Airmen, who were a group of primarily African-American military pilots (fighter and bomber) and airmen who fought in World War II. The name also applies to the navigators, bombardiers, mechanics, instructors, crew chiefs, nurses, cooks and other support personnel. They were collectively awarded the Congressional Gold Medal in 2006.

There are 1007 documented Tuskegee Airmen Pilots. For a complete list of 1007 graduate cadet pilots, see the List of Tuskegee Airmen Cadet Pilot Graduation Classes.

List of Tuskegee Airmen

A

 Paul Adams (pilot)
 Rutherford H. Adkins
 Halbert Alexander
 William Armstrong
 Lee Archer
 Robert Ashby

B

 William Bartley
 Howard Baugh
 Henry Cabot Lodge Bohler
 George L. Brown
 Harold Brown
 Roscoe Brown
 Victor W. Butler
 William Burden

C

 William A. Campbell
 Herbert Carter 
 Raymond Cassagnol
 Eugene Calvin Cheatham Jr.
 Herbert V. Clark
 Granville C. Coggs
  Thomas T.J. Collins
 Milton Crenchaw
 Woodrow Crockett
 Lemuel R. Custis
 Floyd J. Crawthon Jr
 Doodie Head

D

 Clarence Dart
 Alfonza W. Davis
 Benjamin O. Davis Jr. (C/O)
 Charles DeBow
 Wilfred DeFour
 Gene Derricotte
 Lawrence Dickson
 Charles W. Dryden

E

 John Ellis Edwards
 Leslie Edwards Jr.
 Thomas Ellis
 Joseph Elsberry

F
 Leavie Farro Jr
 James Clayton Flowers
 Julius Freeman
 Robert Friend (pilot)
 William J. Faulkner Jr.

G

 Joseph Gomer
 Alfred Gorham
 Oliver Goodall
 Garry Fuller

H

 James H. Harvey
 Donald A. Hawkins
 Kenneth R. Hawkins
 Raymond V. Haysbert
 Percy Heath
 Maycie Herrington
 Mitchell Higginbotham
 William Lee Hill
 Esteban Hotesse
 George Hudson Jr.
 Lincoln Hudson

I
 George J. Iles

J

 Eugene B. Jackson
 Daniel "Chappie" James Jr.
 Alexander Jefferson
 Buford A. Johnson
 Herman A. Johnson
 Theodore Johnson

K
 Celestus King III 
 James Johnson Kelly
 James B. Knighten

L

 Erwin B. Lawrence Jr.
 Clarence D. Lester
 Theodore Lumpkin Jr
 John Lyle

M

 Hiram Mann
 Walter Manning
 Robert L. Martin
 Armour G. McDaniel
 Charles McGee
 Faythe A. McGinnis
 John "Mule" Miles
 John Mosley

N
 Fitzroy Newsum
 Norman L Northcross

O

P

 Noel F. Parrish
 Alix Pasquet
 Wendell O. Pruitt
 Louis R. Purnell Sr.

R

 Wallace P. Reed
 William E. Rice
 Eugene J. Richardson, Jr.
 George S. Roberts
 Lawrence E. Roberts
 Isaiah Edward Robinson Jr.
 Willie Rogers
 Mac Ross

S

 Robert Searcy
 David Showell
 Wilmeth Sidat-Singh
 Eugene Smith
 Calvin J. Spann
 Vernon Sport
 Lowell Steward
 Harry Stewart, Jr.
 Charles "Chuck" Stone Jr.
 Percy Sutton

T
 Alva Temple
 Roger Terry
 Lucius Theus
 Edward L. Toppins
 Robert B. Tresville
 Andrew D. Turner
 Herbert Thorpe
 Richard Thorpe

U

V
 Thomas Franklin Vaughns
  Virgil Richardson

W

 William Harold Walker
 Spann Watson
 Luke J. Weathers, Jr.
 Sherman W. White
 Malvin "Mal" Whitfield
 James T. Wiley
 Oscar Lawton Wilkerson
 Henry Wise Jr.
 Kenneth Wofford

X

Y
 Coleman Young
 Perry H. Young Jr.

Z

Aircraft

 Bell P-39 Airacobra
 Curtiss P-40 Warhawk
 North American B-25 Mitchell
 North American P-51 Mustang
 Republic P-47 Thunderbolt

See also
Executive Order 9981
List of Tuskegee Airmen Cadet Pilot Graduation Classes
Military history of African Americans

References

Notes

Tuskegee Airmen

Tuskegee Airmen
Tuskegee Airmen
Tuskegee Airmen